The Sandridge Bridge is a historic bridge, originally carrying a railway, over the Yarra River in Melbourne, Victoria, Australia. In 2006 it was redeveloped as a pedestrian and cycle path featuring public art. It is the third bridge on the site and is listed on the Victorian Heritage Register.

History 

The first bridge on the site was built in 1853 for the original Melbourne and Hobson's Bay Railway Company line to Sandridge from Flinders Street to Port Melbourne at Hobsons Bay on Port Phillip – the first railway in Australia to operate steam locomotives. In 1857 the St Kilda railway line had opened parallel to part of the line to Sandridge, and the original bridge was replaced in 1858 by a timber trestle bridge carrying two lines of rail traffic, with the tight curve of the original railway removed by rebuilding the bridge on a more oblique angle as seen today.

The current bridge was designed by the Victorian Railways and the contract let to David Munro & Co in 1886, the four track bridge opening for traffic in 1888. The actual junction of the Port Melbourne and St Kilda lines was at Flinders Street, with the two pairs of tracks running parallel until Clarendon Street, where the St Kilda line diverged south. Constructed at a 33-degree angle to the river bank, it was one of the first railway structures in Melbourne to use steel girders rather than iron, and the workforce included a young engineering student, John Monash. On either side of the river the steel girders were supported by bluestone and brick buttresses, and on the south side the structure continued as a brickwork viaduct. In the 1920 overhead electrical masts were added as part of the electrification of the line, and the original timber deck was replaced with rail and concrete slabs.

The bridge was last used in 1987 with the conversion of the St Kilda and Port Melbourne railway lines to light rail. Some proposals were made for the light rail to continue over the Sandridge Bridge into Flinders Street station, but instead they were diverted from the railway reserve at Clarendon Street and sent into the city via Spencer Street. The light rail operates today as the route 96 tram to St Kilda, and route 109 tram to Port Melbourne.

The viaduct over Queensbridge Street and the embankment across the South Bank were listed by the National Trust and were noted as being historically significant, but were still removed. Only the segment over the river itself was retained, with a number of different redevelopment plans proposed during the 1990s.

Redevelopment 

In 2001 the State Government held an expressions of interest process for refurbishment of the bridge, seeking commercial ventures, but the process was not successful and in 2003 Melbourne City Council and the Department of Sustainability and Environment took over. They committed $15.5 million to restore the bridge, create a plaza on the Southbank side and make connections to walkways on the Yarra north bank. In 2005 it was announced that artist Nadim Karam had been commissioned to create ten abstract sculptures in a piece titled The Travellers, which represents the different types of immigrants who traditionally arrived by train over the bridge from Station Pier. Nine of the sculptures move across the bridge in a 15-minute sequence, moving on bogies running between the two bridge spans.

The bridge was unveiled three days before the 2006 Commonwealth Games in Melbourne, at a final cost of $18.5 million. It included a new pedestrian and cycle path and public space, connecting a new Queensbridge Square at Southbank to Flinders Walk on the north bank. However, only the eastern half of the bridge was reopened, the western half being stabilised and fenced off from public access.

On 11 June 2007, the bridge was vandalised when persons unknown used a sledgehammer to smash 46 of the 128 glass panels of the Travellers exhibit. Each glass panel offers information about Australian indigenous peoples or the countries of immigrants to Australia, from Afghanistan to Zimbabwe. It was expected to cost between A$200,000 and A$300,000 to repair and city councillors are considering using more durable materials to replace the glass.

Specifications 
The bridge is 178.4 metres (585 ft) long and is made up of five spans, measuring in length, from the south bank to the north bank: 36.9 metres (121.1 ft), 36.6 metres (120.1 ft), 36.3 metres (119.1 ft), 36.9 metres (121.1 ft) and 31.7 metres (104 ft). The bridge is 17 metres (55.8 ft) wide and the girders are 2.74 metres (8.98 ft) high from the top to the bottom of the flange.

Gallery

References 

Pedestrian bridges in Melbourne
Heritage sites in Melbourne
Bridges completed in 1888
Bridges over the Yarra River
1888 establishments in Australia
Former railway bridges in Australia
Transport in the City of Melbourne (LGA)
Buildings and structures in the City of Melbourne (LGA)
Southbank, Victoria